B. Mahadevan. Pillai was an Indian politician. He was the president of the Tamil Nadu Pradesh Congress Committee after the demise of Kamaraj Nadar and also a member of the All India Congress Committee. He was elected to the Tamil Nadu Legislative Assembly as an Indian National Congress candidate from Kanyakumari constituency in Kanyakumari district in 1967 election.

Personal life
Born in Nagercoil, Mr. Pillai has two brothers, namely CA Thanupillai and Dr. Subramonian. Both prominent personalities in their corresponding fields.

References 

People from Kanyakumari district
Indian National Congress politicians from Tamil Nadu
Year of birth missing (living people)
Living people